The Manjalar Dam is a dam across the Manjalar River in the Indian state of Tamil Nadu. 

The dam is situated in Dindigul District, Manjalar Dam has been constructed for irrigation purposes.

See also
Sothuparai Dam
Vaigai Dam

References

Manjalar River
Dams in Tamil Nadu
Year of establishment missing